Yukhym Leonidovych Zvyahilsky (20 February 1933 – 6 November 2021) was a Ukrainian politician. He is the only member of Verkhovna Rada who was elected to parliament in eight elections (from 1990 until Zvyahilsky did not participate in the 2019 Ukrainian parliamentary election).

In 1993 and 1994, Zvyahilsky served as the First Vice-Prime Minister and acting Prime Minister.

Biography
Zvyahilsky was born the son of a Jewish civil servant in Stalino on 20 February 1933. In 1956, he graduated from the Donetsk Industrial Institute as a mining engineer. After graduating, Zvyahilsky worked at mine #13 of the Soviet trust company "Kuibyshevugol" (Kuibyshev Coal) as a chief assistant, later as a chief of a coal precinct, chief engineer, and director. In 1972 he wrote a thesis, "Observation of regional technological schemes of mining fields in the development of thin inclined layers (in reference to the Donetsk-Makiivka region of Donetsk basin)" (Moscow Mining Institute), earning him the academical title of a Candidate of Sciences. Later Zvyahilsky defended his doctorate on the subject "Geomechanical foundations of landslides of the earth surface above mines, which can be eliminated" (Institute of geotechnical mechanics of the National Academy of Sciences of Ukraine). Coincidentally, in the early 1990s, Ukraine suffered from the miners' strikes that led to the early presidential elections in 1994.

From 1970 to 1979, Zvyahilsky worked at the Kuibyshev Mine Corporation of the Industrial Union "Donetskugol" (Donetsk Coal). In 1975 he was appointed a director of the company. From 1979 through 1992, Zvyahilsky was a director of the Zasyadko coal mine of the Industrial Union "Donetskugol". The mine, known for its chronic accidents, became particularly famous in 2007 for the most deadly disaster in the mining history of Ukraine.

In March 1990, as a member of the Communist Party of the Soviet Union, Zvyahilsky was elected to the Parliament of Ukraine from the 112th electoral district. In November 1992, he was appointed the city council and executive committee chairman. In June 1993, Zvyahilsky was appointed to the Kuchma's Cabinet as the First Vice-Prime Minister. Being the First Vice-Prime Minister in the Cabinet of Kuchma, he served as an acting-Prime Minister from 22 September 1993 after Leonid Kuchma was elected the President of Ukraine. Zvyahilsky was the longest-serving Prime Minister without being officially appointed to the role. Zvyahilsky kept the appointment until Vitaliy Masol was confirmed as the Prime Minister of Ukraine in June 1994. 

In March 1994, now as an independent, Zvyahilsky was elected to the parliament from the 110th electoral district. In 1994, Zviahilskyi, being perceived as affiliated with Leonid Kravchuk, was accused of having stolen some $20 million by Ukrainian President Kuchma during his term as acting Prime Minister, and he fled to Israel in fear for his life. Zvyagilsky was also accused of transporting $300 million in illegal cash to Israel in 1994 with the help of the Israeli special service Nativ. After some time Zviahilskyi returned to Ukraine in March 1997 and as a sitting member of Verkhovna Rada missed most of the sessions of the parliament.

In 1998, Zvyahilsky, once again as an independent, was elected now from the 43rd electoral district. In 2002, he was again elected to the parliament as a member of the Party of Regions. Zvyahilsky became a member of the Verkhovna Rada (parliament), representing the ruling Party of Regions, and owner of the Zasyadko coal mine in Donetsk. Being a member of Parliament, he had immunity from prosecution. In the 2012 parliamentary elections elected for the Party of Regions in a single-mandate majoritarian election district number 45 with 72.59% of the votes.

In the 2014 parliamentary election, Zvyahilsky was re-elected into parliament again as an independent candidate in single-member districts number 45 situated in the Kyiv Raion of Donetsk; this time with 72.73% of the votes. In his constituency, only a handful of polling stations were open due to the War in Donbas; this led to Zvyahilsky winning a seat with only 1,450 votes. In parliament he joined the faction of Opposition Bloc.

Zvyahilsky did not participate in the 2019 Ukrainian parliamentary election for the first time since 1990 he did not run for parliamentary elections. He died on 6 November 2021, aged 88, from complications of COVID-19 during the COVID-19 pandemic in Ukraine.

He also was co-president of the Jewish Conference of Ukraine.

Awards
 Jubilee Medal "In Commemoration of the 100th Anniversary of the Birth of Vladimir Ilyich Lenin" (1970)
 Order of the Red Banner of Labour (1971)
 Distinguished Miner of Ukraine (1979)
 Order of the October Revolution (1981)
 Hero of Socialist Labour (1986)
 Honorary citizen of Donetsk (1998)
 State Prize of Ukraine in the field of science and technology (2002)
 Hero of Ukraine (2003)
 Order of Prince Yaroslav the Wise, 5th class (2009)
 Order of Prince Yaroslav the Wise, 4th class (2013)

See also
 List of mayors of Donetsk

References

External links
 CLAN of Yanukovich: ZVYAHILSKY 

1933 births
2021 deaths
Politicians from Donetsk
Communist Party of the Soviet Union members
Donetsk National Technical University alumni
First convocation members of the Verkhovna Rada
Second convocation members of the Verkhovna Rada
Third convocation members of the Verkhovna Rada
Fourth convocation members of the Verkhovna Rada
Fifth convocation members of the Verkhovna Rada
Sixth convocation members of the Verkhovna Rada
Seventh convocation members of the Verkhovna Rada
Eighth convocation members of the Verkhovna Rada
Acting prime ministers of Ukraine
First vice prime ministers of Ukraine
Mayors of Donetsk
Opposition Bloc politicians
Party of Regions politicians
Heroes of Socialist Labour
Laureates of the State Prize of Ukraine in Science and Technology
Recipients of the Honorary Diploma of the Cabinet of Ministers of Ukraine
Recipients of the Order of Lenin
Recipients of the Order of Prince Yaroslav the Wise, 4th class
Recipients of the Order of Prince Yaroslav the Wise, 5th class
Recipients of the Order of the Red Banner of Labour
Recipients of the Order of State
Jewish Ukrainian politicians
Ukrainian Jews
Deaths from the COVID-19 pandemic in Ukraine
Burials at Baikove Cemetery
Moscow State Mining University alumni